Chronicles of Chaos is the title of:

 Chronicles of Chaos (webzine), launched 1995
 Chronicles of Chaos (fantasy trilogy), a novel series by John C. Wright
Orphans of Chaos (2005)
Fugitives of Chaos (2006)
Titans of Chaos (2007)
 Chronicles of Chaos (album) (1997), a compilation album of the American thrash metal band Sadus